Dungan ( or ) is a Sinitic language spoken primarily in Kazakhstan and Kyrgyzstan by the Dungan people, an ethnic group related to the Hui people of China. Although it is derived from the Central Plains Mandarin of Gansu and Shaanxi, it is written in Cyrillic (or Xiao'erjing) and contains loanwords and archaisms not found in other modern varieties of Mandarin.

History 
The Dungan people of Kazakhstan and Kyrgyzstan (with smaller groups living in other post-Soviet states) are the descendants of several groups of the Hui people that migrated to the region in the 1870s and the 1880s after the defeat of the Dungan revolt in Northwestern China. The Hui of Northwestern China (often referred to as "Dungans" or "Tungani" by the 19th-century western writers as well as by members of Turkic nationalities in China and Central Asia) would normally speak the same Mandarin dialect as the Han people in the same area (or in the area from which the particular Hui community had been resettled). At the same time, due to their unique history, their speech would be rich in Islamic or Islam-influenced terminology, based on loanwords from Arabic, Persian and Turkic languages, as well as translations of them into Chinese. The Hui traders in the bazaars would be able to use Arabic or Persian numbers when talking between themselves, to keep their communications secret from Han bystanders. While not constituting a separate language, these words, phrases and turns of speech, known as Huihui hua ("Hui speech"), served as markers of group identity. As early 20th century travellers in Northwestern China would note, "the Mohammedan Chinese have to some extent a vocabulary and always a style and manner of speech, all their own".

As the Dungans in the Russian Empire — and even more so in the Soviet Union — were isolated from China, their language experienced significant influence from the Russian and the Turkic languages of their neighbors.

In the Soviet Union, a written standard of the Dungan language was developed, based on a dialect of the Gansu Province, rather than the Beijing base of Standard Chinese. The language was used in the schools in Dungan villages. In the Soviet time there were several school textbooks published for studying the Dungan language, a three volume Russian–Dungan dictionary (14,000 words), the Dungan–Russian dictionary, linguistics monographs on the language and books in Dungan. The first Dungan-language newspaper was established in 1932; it continues publication today in weekly form.

When Dru C. Gladney, who had spent some years working with the Hui people in China, met with Dungans in Almaty in 1988, he described the experience as speaking "in a hybrid Gansu dialect that combined Turkish and Russian lexical items".

Mutual intelligibility with Mandarin dialects 
There is a varying degree of mutual intelligibility between Dungan and various Mandarin dialects. Central Plains Mandarin varieties are understood by Dungans. On the other hand, Dungan speakers like Iasyr Shivaza and others have reported that people who speak the Beijing Mandarin dialect can understand Dungan, but Dungans could not understand the Beijing Mandarin.

Demographics 
Dungan is spoken primarily in Kyrgyzstan, with speakers in Russia, Kazakhstan and Uzbekistan as well. The Dungan ethnic group are the descendants of refugees from China who migrated west into Central Asia.

According to the Soviet census statistics from 1970 to 1989, the Dungan maintained the use of their ethnic language much more successfully than other minority ethnic groups in Central Asia; however, in the post-Soviet period, the proportion of Dungans speaking the Dungan language as their native language appears to have fallen sharply.

Grammar

Classifiers 

Chinese varieties usually have different classifiers for different types of nouns, with northern varieties tending to have fewer classifiers than southern ones.  is the only classifier found in the Dungan language, though not the only measure word.

Phonology 
In basic structure and vocabulary, the Dungan language is not very different from Mandarin Chinese, specifically a variety of Zhongyuan Mandarin (not Lan-Yin Mandarin) spoken in the southern part of the province of Gansu and the western part of the valley of Guanzhong in the province of Shaanxi. Like other Chinese varieties, Dungan is tonal. There are two main dialects, one with 4 tones and the other, considered standard, with 3 tones in the final position in phonetic words and 4 tones in the nonfinal position.

Consonants 

 can also be heard as a voiced fricative  among other Gansw dialects.

Vowels 

Vowel constructs that can be used as independent syllable without consonants are shown in parenthesis. There are rhotacised vowels, as well as some syllables only seen in loan words from Russian, Arabic, Kyrgyz, etc., in addition to the above table.

Tones 
Tones in Dungan are marked with nothing (tone 1), a ъ (tone 2) and ь (tone 3).

Vocabulary 
The basilects of Gansu/Shaanxi Mandarin and Dungan are largely mutually intelligible; Chinese journalists conversant in one of those Mandarin dialects report that they can make themselves understood when communicating with Dungan speakers. However, even at the level of basic vocabulary, Dungan contains many words not present in modern Mandarin dialects, such as Arabic and Persian loanwords, as well as archaic Qing dynasty-era Chinese vocabulary. Furthermore, the acrolects of Dungan and Gansu/Shaanxi Mandarin have diverged significantly due to time and cultural influences. During the 20th century, translators and intellectuals introduced many neologisms and calques into the Chinese language, especially for political and technical concepts. However, the Dungan, cut off from the mainstream of Chinese discourse by orthographic barriers, instead borrowed words for those same concepts from Russian, with which they came into contact through government and higher education. As a result of these borrowings, the equivalent standard Chinese terms are not widely known or understood among the Dungan.

Writing system 
The modern Dungan language is the only spoken Chinese that is written in the Cyrillic alphabet, as they lived under Soviet rule. It is a Russian-based alphabet plus five special letters: Ә, Җ, Ң, Ү and Ў. As such, it differs somewhat from the Palladius System that is normally used in Russia to write Chinese in Cyrillic.

Note
The letters ъ and ь are only used to write Russian loanwords and tone markings on children's primers dictionaries

Dungan is unique in that it is one of the few varieties of Chinese that is not normally written using Chinese characters. Though it may be seen written in Chinese characters, this writing system is now considered obsolete, much like the Arabic-script Xiao’erjing. Originally, the Dungan, who were Muslim descendants of the Hui, wrote their language in an Arabic-based alphabet known as Xiao'erjing. The Soviet Union banned all Arabic scripts in the late 1920s, which led to a Latin orthography based on Yañalif. The Latin orthography lasted until 1940, when the Soviet government promulgated the current Cyrillic-based system. Xiao'erjing is now virtually extinct in Dungan society, but it remains in limited use by some Hui communities in China.

The writing system is based on the standard 3-tone dialect. Tone marks or numbering do not appear in general-purpose writing, but are specified in dictionaries, even for loanwords. The tones are specified using the soft sign, hard sign, or none.

Comparison with Palladius system

Literature 
A number of books in Dungan language, including textbooks, Dungan-Russian and Russian-Dungan dictionaries, a Dungan etymological dictionary, collections of folk tales, original and translated fiction and poetry have been published in Kyrgyzstan. Usual print runs were no more than a few hundred copies. A newspaper in Dungan has been published as well.

Works of the Dungan poet Yasir Shiwaza have been translated into Russian, Standard Chinese and a number of other languages, with print runs in some of them been much higher than in the original Dungan. English translations of some of them, along with the original Dungan text, are available in the book by S. Rimsky-Korsakoff (1991).

See also 
 Cyrillization of Chinese

Notes

References

Citations

Sources 
 General references

 
 Svetlana Rimsky-Korsakoff Dyer, Iasyr Shivaza: The Life and Works of a Soviet Dungan Poet. 1991. . (Contains a detailed bibliography and ample samples of Shivaza works', some in the original Cyrillic Dungan, although most in a specialized transcription, with English and sometimes standard Chinese translations).
 Olga I. Zavjalova. "Some Phonological Aspects of the Dungan Dialects." Computational Analyses of Asian and African Languages. Tokyo, 1978. No. 9. Pp. 1–24. (Contains an experimental analysis of Dungan tones).
 Olga Zavyalova. “Dungan Language.” Encyclopedia of Chinese Language and Linguistics. General Editor Rint Sybesma. Vol. 2. Leiden–Boston: Brill, 2017. pp. 141–148. 
 Hai Feng (海峰). 《中亚东干语言研究》 (Zhongya Donggan yuyan yanjiu—A Study of the Dungan Language of Central Asia.) Urumchi, 2003. . (Description of the Dungan language by a professor of Xinjiang University).

External links

"Implications of the Soviet Dungan Script for Chinese Language Reform": long essay on Dungan, with sample texts
Dungan writing system in Omniglot
The Shaanxi Village in Kazakhstan
Soviet census data for mother tongue and second language, in English
Central Asian Dungan as a Chinese Dialect

Languages of Kyrgyzstan
Languages of Kazakhstan
Mandarin Chinese
Languages of Russia
Languages of Tajikistan
Languages of Turkmenistan
Languages of Uzbekistan
Dungan